Des Maea (born 22 March 1969) is a New Zealand former professional rugby league footballer.

He played for the Sheffield Eagles in 1993 and in 1994 returned to New Zealand to play for the Counties Manukau Heroes in the Lion Red Cup where he played in 21 matches, scoring 9 tries for the club. He played for the Mangere East Hawks in the Auckland Rugby League competition.

Des Maea was a Samoan international and played at the 1995 Rugby League World Cup. He was in the Auckland Warriors squad for the 1995 Rugby League World Sevens but never played a first grade game for the club. He played 15 Lion Red Cup games for their Colts team in 1995. He also played for the Hunslet Hawks between 1995 and 1996.

References

External links
World Cup 1995 details
Profile at Rugby League Project

1969 births
Living people
Samoa national rugby league team players
Counties Manukau rugby league team players
Sheffield Eagles (1984) players
Hunslet R.L.F.C. players
Mangere East Hawks players
Auckland rugby league team players
Otahuhu Leopards players
New Zealand sportspeople of Samoan descent
New Zealand rugby league players
New Zealand expatriate rugby league players
Expatriate rugby league players in England
New Zealand expatriate sportspeople in England